Hays Lake is a lake in Clearwater County, Minnesota, in the United States.

Hays Lake was named for an assistant to Jacob V. Brower.

See also
List of lakes in Minnesota

References

Lakes of Minnesota
Lakes of Clearwater County, Minnesota